Next in Fashion (NIF) is a Netflix reality show and fashion design competition series hosted by fashion designer Tan France and model Gigi Hadid (formerly hosted by France and fellow designer Alexa Chung). It follows designers from around the world as they compete for the chance to win $200,000 and debut a collection on luxury fashion retailer site Net-a-Porter.

In June 2020, Netflix announced it was cancelling the series after one season. Nevertheless, it was announced on the series’s Instagram that the show would have a second season that would feature Tan France and Gigi Hadid. The second season premiered on 3 March 2023.

Production 
The show was announced in May 2019, with co-hosts Alexa Chung and Tan France attached, as well as stylist Elizabeth Stewart and Instagram's Eva Chen as judges. Filming wrapped in May 2019.

The series was created and produced by theoldschool and executive produced by Robin Ashbrook and Yasmin Shackleton with co-executive producer Adam Cooper.

According to an interview with PinkNews, Chung and France met at a Victoria Beckham party during London Fashion Week. France had already signed onto Next in Fashion and mentioned the role to Chung, who was "too drunk to realise" at the time.

In a statement to Variety, Netflix's vice president of unscripted originals and comedy specials Brandon Riegg explained why it made sense for the company to venture into the fashion competition series category:Fashion is something that is really appealing and relatable, and so it made sense for us to get into that space considering our viewers around the world ... It is also an opportunity to gauge the fashion enthusiasm of fans and showcase some amazing talent and stories [from designers], the struggles and the victories, and help them elevate their own brand to the next level through the show.Riegg also discussed the importance of the show's global casting:“One of the core tenets of our approach to programming is having diversity, and diversity comes in lots of different forms; obviously we are a global platform ... But really it came to finding great characters with great story, and who are credible in the fashion space. And that was a big driver in terms of the casting. It just happened that we looked everywhere in looking for those qualities in the contestants and it allowed us to have more of a global group of contestants for this series in particular.”

Season 1

Designers
Source: Radio Times

Designer progress

Because the judges were unable to agree, no one was eliminated in this challenge.

 The designer won Next in Fashion Season 1.
 The designer was runner-up for Next in Fashion Season 1.
 The designer advanced to the Finale.
 The designer/design team won the challenge.
 The designer/design team was considered to win the challenge, and was ultimately safe.
 The designer/design team was considered for the bottom, but was ultimately safe.
 The designer/design team was in the bottom, but was not eliminated.
 The designer lost and was eliminated from the competition.

Season 2

Designers
Source: Netflix.com

Designer progress

The hosts decided not to eliminate a contestant in this episode.

  The designer won Next in Fashion Season 2.
  The designer was Runner-up for Next in Fashion Season 2.
  The designer advanced to the finale.
  The designer/design team won the challenge.
 The designer/design team was considered to win the challenge, and was ultimately safe.
 The designer/design team was in the bottom, but was not eliminated.
  The designer lost and was eliminated from the competition.

Episodes
The contestants are shown in a modern warehouse space that serves as both the workroom, and on show days, a runway space complete with area for hair and makeup stations. A fully-stocked fabrics and notions “closet” is adapted for each challenge, and producers will get any item that is needed outside of the supplies provided.

Alexa Chung and Tan France serve as both hosts and judges, with two or three more judges for each challenge. In each episode Chung and France reveal the theme and introduce the guest judge. The designers then each occupy a large work table, and pull fabrics and supplies. The bulk of the pre-runway show is an overview of the contestants' designing and construction process, typically over two work days.

The runway contest itself has a catwalk, and fully digitized floors and walls. During the show the judges' comments are overheard; following the catwalk show the judges visit each entry, inspect the work, and ask questions of the designer. Following the judges' deliberations, the winner and bottom two entries are revealed. After more discussion one or more designers are eliminated.

Season one episodes were posted for streaming .

Season 1 (2020)

Season 2 (2023)

See also 
 Making the Cut
 Styling Hollywood

References

External links 
Official Website
 

2020 American television series debuts
2020 American television series endings
2020s American reality television series
Fashion-themed reality television series
English-language Netflix original programming
Reality web series
Reality competition television series